Abrodictyum is a fern genus in the family Hymenophyllaceae. The genus is accepted in the Pteridophyte Phylogeny Group classification of 2016 (PPG I) but not by some other sources, which sink it into a broadly defined Trichomanes.

Taxonomy
The genus Abrodictyum was erected by Carl Presl in 1843. Its status, like other genera in the family Hymenophyllaceae, remains disputed. The Pteridophyte Phylogeny Group classification of 2016 (PPG I) accepts the genus, placing it in the subfamily Trichomanoideae, and saying that there are about 25 species. , the Checklist of Ferns and Lycophytes of the World listed 41 species, whereas Plants of the World Online sank the genus into Trichomanes.

Species 
, the Checklist of Ferns and Lycophytes of the World accepted the following species:

Abrodictyum angustimarginatum (Bonap.) J.P.Roux
Abrodictyum asae-grayi (Bosch) Ebihara & K.Iwats.
Abrodictyum boninense Tagawa & K.Iwats. ex K.Iwats.
Abrodictyum brassii (Croxall) Ebihara & K.Iwats.
Abrodictyum caespifrons (C.Chr.) comb. ined.
Abrodictyum caudatum (Brack.) Ebihara & K.Iwats.
Abrodictyum cellulosum (Klotzsch) Ebihara & Dubuisson
Abrodictyum clathratum (Tagawa) Ebihara & K.Iwats.
Abrodictyum compactum (Alderw.) comb. ined.
Abrodictyum cumingii C. Presl
Abrodictyum cylindratum Dubuisson
Abrodictyum dentatum (Bosch) Ebihara & K.Iwats.
Abrodictyum elongatum (A.Cunn.) Ebihara & K.Iwats.
Abrodictyum extravagans (Copel.) comb. ined.
Abrodictyum flavofuscum (Bosch) Ebihara & K.Iwats.
Abrodictyum franceae Dubuisson et al.
Abrodictyum gemmatum (J. Sm. ex Baker) comb. ined.
Abrodictyum guineense (Afzel. ex Sw.) J.P.Roux
Abrodictyum idoneum (C.V.Morton) Ebihara & K.Iwats.
Abrodictyum kalimantanense (K.Iwats. & M.Kato) Ebihara & K.Iwats.
Abrodictyum laetum (Bosch) Ebihara & K.Iwats.
Abrodictyum meifolium (Bory ex Willd.) Ebihara & K.Iwats.
Abrodictyum muluense (K.Iwats.) comb. ined.
Abrodictyum obscurum (Blume) Ebihara & K.Iwats.
Abrodictyum pachyphlebium (C.Chr.) Bauret & Dubuisson
Abrodictyum pluma (Hook.) Ebihara & K.Iwats.
Abrodictyum polystromaticum (Bierh.) comb. ined.
Abrodictyum pseudoarbuscula (Alderw.) comb. ined.
Abrodictyum pseudorigidum Dubuisson et al.
Abrodictyum rigidum (Sw.) Ebihara & Dubuisson
Abrodictyum saxatile (T. Moore) Parris
Abrodictyum schlechteri (Brause) Ebihara & K.Iwats.
Abrodictyum schultzei (Brause) comb. ined.
Abrodictyum setaceum (Bosch) Ebihara & K.Iwats.
Abrodictyum setigerum (Backh.) Parris
Abrodictyum sprucei (Baker) Ebihara & Dubuisson
Abrodictyum strictum (Menzies ex Hook. & Grev.) Ebihara & K.Iwats.
Abrodictyum stylosum (Poir.) J.P.Roux
Abrodictyum tamarisciforme (Jacq.) Ebihara & Dubuisson
Abrodictyum truncatum (Copel.) comb. ined.
Abrodictyum windischianum (Lellinger) comb. ined.

Phylogeny
Phylogeny by Fern Tree of Life.

References 

Hymenophyllales
Fern genera